Vreoci is a suburban neighborhood in Belgrade, Serbia. It is located in Belgrade's municipality of Lazarevac.

References

External links 

Neighborhoods of Belgrade
Lazarevac